The 2008 Malta Cup was a professional non-ranking snooker tournament that took place between 4 and 10 February 2008 at the Hilton Conference Center in Portomaso, Malta.

The Gambling Commission looked at allegations of match-fixing during the round-robin stage of the tournament.

Shaun Murphy won the title by defeating Ken Doherty 9–3 in the final.


Group stage
Group matches were played over 6 frames. A win was worth 2 points and a tie 1 point. The top player from each group qualified to the semi-finals.

Group 1

John Higgins 6–0 Alex Borg
Joe Perry 3–3 Ryan Day
John Higgins 4–2 Ryan Day
Ali Carter 5–1 Alex Borg
Joe Perry 4–2 Alex Borg
John Higgins 3–3 Ali Carter
Joe Perry 4–2 Ali Carter
Ryan Day 3–3 Alex Borg
John Higgins 5–1 Joe Perry
Ali Carter 2–4 Ryan Day

Group 2

Ken Doherty 4–2 Marco Fu
Neil Robertson 5–1 Stephen Lee
Ken Doherty 4–2 Stephen Lee
Joe Swail 1–5 Marco Fu
Ken Doherty 5–1 Joe Swail
Neil Robertson 3–3 Marco Fu
Neil Robertson 4–2 Joe Swail
Stephen Lee 1–5 Marco Fu
Ken Doherty 5–1 Neil Robertson
Joe Swail 1–5 Stephen Lee

Group 3

 
Shaun Murphy 6–0 Tony Drago
Stephen Hendry 4–2 Mark Selby
Stephen Maguire 4–2 Tony Drago
Shaun Murphy 4–2 Mark Selby
Stephen Hendry 4–2 Tony Drago
Shaun Murphy 4–2 Stephen Maguire
Mark Selby 4–2 Tony Drago
Stephen Hendry 3–3 Stephen Maguire
Shaun Murphy 5–1 Stephen Hendry
Stephen Maguire 3–3 Mark Selby

Group 4

Graeme Dott 2–4 Dominic Dale
Peter Ebdon 2–4 Ding Junhui
Graeme Dott 3–3 Ding Junhui
Mark Williams 2–4 Dominic Dale
Graeme Dott 2–4 Mark Williams
Peter Ebdon 2–4 Dominic Dale
Mark Williams 3–3 Peter Ebdon
Ding Junhui 4–2 Dominic Dale
Graeme Dott 2–4 Peter Ebdon
Mark Williams 0–6 Ding Junhui

Knock-out stage

Final

Century breaks

137, 110, 104  Shaun Murphy
134, 127, 118  Ken Doherty
129, 100  Ali Carter
128, 103  Peter Ebdon
127, 125, 125, 123, 106  Ding Junhui
127, 110, 101  Mark Selby
116, 107  Neil Robertson
113  Ryan Day
108, 106, 101  Marco Fu
103  Stephen Hendry

References

European Masters (snooker)
Malta
Malta Cup
Snooker in Malta